Pstruží is a municipality and village in Frýdek-Místek District in the Moravian-Silesian Region of the Czech Republic. It has about 1,100 inhabitants. It lies in the Moravian-Silesian Foothills.

References

External links

 

Villages in Frýdek-Místek District